John Considine may refer to:

 John Considine (impresario) (1868–1943), American impresario and vaudeville pioneer from Seattle
 John W. Considine Jr. (1898–1961), his son, American film producer
 John Considine (actor) (born 1935), his son, American writer and actor
 John J. Considine (born 1948), former American politician and attorney
 John Considine (hurler) (born 1964), Irish hurling manager and former player
 John Considine, editor of the Oxford Dictionary of National Biography